Divot Diggers is a 1936 Our Gang short comedy film directed by Robert F. McGowan; It was the 142nd Our Gang short to be released.

Plot
The action takes place at an expansive California golf course, where the gang merrily play their own ragtag version of golf with makeshift clubs. When the course's regular caddies quit en masse, the desperate caddy master hires the gang members as replacements. The kids—and their gibberish-spouting pet chimpanzee—proceed to drive an adult foursome crazy, then put the finishing touch on an imperfect day by accidentally commandeering a lawn-mowing tractor.

Cast

The Gang
 Darla Hood as Darla
 Eugene Lee as Porky
 George McFarland as Spanky
 Carl Switzer as Alfalfa
 Billie Thomas as Buckwheat
 Patsy May as Baby Patsy
 Harold Switzer as Harold
 Pete The Pup as himself
 Jiggs The Chimpanzee as Chimpanzee

Additional cast
 Leonard Kibrick as Caddy
 Billy Bletcher as Bill, golfer
 Tom Dugan - Aggravated golfer
 Jack Hatfield as Mr. Hatfield, the caddy master
 Thomas Pogue as Mr. Jackson, golfer
 David Thursby as John, golfer
 Russ Powell as Chimpanzee (voice)
 Hubert Diltz - Tractor driver
 Jack Hill as Golfer
 Matty Roubert as Caddy

Notes
After several years away from the Our Gang series, longtime mentor Robert F. McGowan briefly resumed his directorial activities.
Divot Diggers featured several new Leroy Shield musical compositions, including "Hot and Dry", "Standing on the Corner", "Beyond the Rainbow" and "Up in Room 4".
Leonard Kibrick's final short was Divot Diggers save for The Lucky Corner, which was shot in 1935.

See also
 Our Gang filmography

References

External links

1936 films
1936 comedy films
1936 short films
American black-and-white films
Films directed by Robert F. McGowan
Golf films
Hal Roach Studios short films
Our Gang films
1930s American films